Yasutaka is a masculine Japanese given name.

Possible writings
Yasutaka can be written using many different combinations of kanji characters. Here are some examples:

靖隆, "peaceful, noble"
靖孝, "peaceful, filial piety"
靖貴, "peaceful, precious"
靖喬, "peaceful, high"
靖高, "peaceful, tall"
靖昂, "peaceful, rise"
康隆, "healthy, noble"
康孝, "healthy, filial piety"
康貴, "healthy, precious"
康喬, "healthy, high"
康高, "healthy, tall"
康昂, "healthy, rise"
安隆, "tranquil, noble"
安孝, "tranquil, filial piety"
安貴, "tranquil, precious"
安高, "tranquil, tall"
保隆, "preserve, noble"
保孝, "preserve, filial piety"
保貴, "preserve, precious"
泰隆, "peaceful, noble"
泰孝, "peaceful, filial piety"
易昂, "divination, rise"

The name can also be written in hiragana やすたか or katakana ヤスタカ.

Notable people with the name
, Japanese baseball player
, Japanese mathematician
, Japanese footballer
Yasutaka Matsudaira (松平 康荘, 1867–1930), Japanese marquis
, Japanese businessman
, Japanese musician
, Japanese footballer
, Japanese kokugaku scholar
, Japanese basketball player
, Japanese sumo wrestler
, Japanese volleyball player
, Japanese cyclist
, Japanese writer and actor
, Japanese tennis player
, Japanese footballer

Japanese masculine given names